Neptunea despecta is a species of large sea snail, a marine gastropod mollusk in the family Buccinidae, the true whelks.

References
 gastropods.com info: 
 ITIS info: 

Buccinidae
Gastropods described in 1758
Taxa named by Carl Linnaeus